A661 may refer to:
 A661 road, a road in England
 Bundesautobahn 661 or BAB 661, a German Autobahn